Paul Nyman (3 August 1929 – 25 November 2020) was a Finnish cyclist. He won the Finnish national road race title in 1955, 1956 and 1958. He also competed at the 1952, 1956 and 1960 Summer Olympics. He started in Peace Race four times: 1954 – did not finish, 1955 – 12., 1956 – 4. (this was the best result of a Finnish rider in this race), 1957 – 22.

References

External links
 

1929 births
2020 deaths
Finnish male cyclists
Olympic cyclists of Finland
Cyclists at the 1952 Summer Olympics
Cyclists at the 1956 Summer Olympics
Cyclists at the 1960 Summer Olympics
Sportspeople from Vyborg